Minestone, also known as colliery spoil, is the solid residual material resulting from the mining of coal. It is likely to contain varying proportions of sandstone, shale, mudstone and coal fragments. The material properties can vary considerably both within a spoil tip and from tip to tip.

References

External links
 Colliery spoil

Coal mining